John Lessels (9 January 1809 – 12 November 1883) was a Scottish architect and artist, notably active in Edinburgh and also the Scottish Borders (he was responsible for numerous buildings and alteration projects in Berwickshire).

Life

He was born and educated in Kirkcaldy, Fife, and initially worked for his father as a carpenter on the Raith estate. He joined the office of William Burn (1789–1870), acting as his inspector of works until he established his own practice in Edinburgh in 1846. Important commissions included the Walker Estate, the area of the western New Town developed from the 1850s, and his appointment as architect to the City Improvement Trust, with David Cousin, in 1866, which oversaw the redevelopment of parts of the Old Town and completion of multiple incomplete schemes in the New Town.

Among his pupils were David MacGibbon (1831–1902) and Robert Rowand Anderson (1834–1921). Lessels was a keen photographer, and was president of the Edinburgh Photographic Society for several years. He also regularly exhibited oil and watercolour paintings at the Royal Scottish Academy.

He spent his later life living at 21 Heriot Row, a magnificent Georgian townhouse facing onto Queen Street Gardens.

He was a prominent freemason and member of the Old Kilwinning Lodge on St John St off the Canongate.

He is buried in Dean Cemetery. The grave lies in the first northern extension in a north-west section, set back but visible from the main east-west path. The grave is the first known grave (1884) to bear a photograph of the deceased. The glazed ceramic tile with this photo has been stolen.

Family life

John's first wife, Mary Henderson (26 June 1808 – 2 January 1858) bore him three children: William, Isabella (1846-1884), and John (1856-1857).
His second wife was Gertrude A. H. Neffkins (d. 13 May 1884)
All are buried together in Dean Cemetery Edinburgh.

He had one son, James Lessels, who survived into adulthood and also became an architect. James finished some schemes (such as Royal Crescent) following his father's death.

List of Works

Lessels was a prolific tenement designer over and above his individual "landmark" buildings. His works include:

Stobo Castle, Peebleshire (1849)
Melville Crescent, in the centre of Melville Street, Edinburgh (1855)
Victoria Primary School, Newhaven, Edinburgh (1861)
Chester Street, Edinburgh (1862)
1–7 Coates Place, Edinburgh (1864)
1-14 Drumsheugh Gardens, Edinburgh (1874-1882) 
4–24, 48–58 Manor Place, Edinburgh (1866–1892)
15–32 West Maitland Street, Edinburgh (1864)
3–21 Palmerston Place, Edinburgh (1870)
Overseeing the rebuilding of Trinity Church on Chalmers Close, Edinburgh, following its stone-by-stone dismantling to build Waverley Station (1871)
Jeffrey Street, Edinburgh (1877)

Notes

References
 
 
 

19th-century Scottish architects
1809 births
1883 deaths
People from Kirkcaldy
Burials at the Dean Cemetery
Scottish Freemasons